Diyadin is a town of Ağrı Province of Turkey. Diyadin may also refer to:

 Diyadin District, a district of Ağrı Province, Turkey
 Diyadin, Azerbaijan, village in Azerbaijan
 Metin Diyadin, Turkish football manager

Turkish-language surnames